Maciej Lewandowski (born 24 April 1985) is a retired Polish figure skater. He appeared in the  Polish version of Dancing on Ice.

Career highlights

 J = Junior level

External links
 Tracings profile

Polish male single skaters
Living people
1985 births
Place of birth missing (living people)